Iraqis in Denmark consist of both immigrants from Iraq to Denmark and their descendants, and may hold either Iraqi or Danish citizenship.

Demographics
With a total Iraqi population in Denmark numbering of 31,322, there are organizations such as the Iraqi-Danish Culture Days, which is currently organized in the capital of Copenhagen. They are the largest Arab ethnic group living in Denmark. They mostly live in the capital Copenhagen, especially in the Nørrebro area.

13,000 Danish Iraqis participated in the Iraqi legislative election in January 2005.

Between 2009 and 2011, Iraqi nationals made up the largest group of unsuccessful asylum seekers in Denmark.

Socioeconomics

According to Statistics Denmark, as of 2014, Iraq-born immigrants aged 30–64 in Denmark have an employment rate of approximately 31.9%. Iraq-born individuals aged 16–64 also have a self-employment rate of around 17%.

Notable people
Fenar Ahmad, filmmaker, producer
Anja Al-Erhayem, filmmaker, born to Iraqi father and Danish mother
Mohamed Ali, singer who appeared on Denmark's X Factor
Tariq Hashim, director
Aida Nadeem, musician
Avar Raza, footballer
Mustafa Hassan, footballer
Ihan Haydar, drummer in the popband L.I.G.A

See also 
 Arabs in Denmark
 Denmark–Iraq relations
 Demographics of Denmark

References

External links 
The Council of Iraqi Community in Denmark https://web.archive.org/web/20090625133229/http://iraqicouncil.dk/

Middle Eastern diaspora in Denmark
Arabs in Denmark
 
 
Denmark